Newcastle University Boat Club (NUBC) is the rowing club of Newcastle University, UK. Established in March 1911 as the boat club for Armstrong College, it celebrated its centenary in 2011, when was also appointed High Performance Programme for heavyweight men and women by British Rowing. In the past 20 years current students and alumni won 60 international vests for GB.

Training facilities 

The club trains on the River Tyne from a purpose-built boathouse on the south bank of the river in the village of Newburn, five miles upriver from the centre of Newcastle upon Tyne. Built in the 1950s, the boathouse is home to the clubs boats, private single sculls and coaching launches; was redeveloped with work finished in 2011. Whilst most training places place along the Wylam, Newburn and Blaydon stretches of river, extended paddles offers crews the opportunity to row under the famous Tyne Bridge on Newcastle's quayside.

Land training takes place at two sites within the city itself. The club uses the University Sports centre in Newcastle and Sports ground at Longbenton, with Concept2 rowing ergometers, RowPerfect and Concept2 Dyno machines and a fully stocked free weights suite. The club also has use of the University's main sports centre, with access to further rowing machines, weights facilities, fitness suite and sports halls for circuit training. Through the University's performance sports programme, elite rowers get access to free physiotherapy, sports massage, nutritional expertise and strength and conditioning coaching.

Boathouse refurbishment 
The club's current boathouse was built in 1953, and by 2009 was in a poor state of repair. Additionally, the growth of the club since 2005 meant that storage space was at a premium and expansion of existing boat racking was essential. In late-2009 the decision was taken by the University to commit £500,000 to a complete refurbishment of the building. When completed, the new facility will have brand new changing/showering facilities, warm-up/stretching area, kitchen and video analysis/meeting room. The existing boat storage area will be refitted with new sliding racks and a dedicated maintenance bay will be created. An additional boat shed has been constructed next to the current building, and it was completed in 2011.

Staff 

Italian coach, Angelo Savarino was appointed Head Coach of the club in 2005. Since then he has overseen a remarkable transformation of the club, with highlights including winning the Prince Albert Challenge Cup at Henley Royal Regatta in 2008, 2013 and 2017 and placing 7th at the Head of the River Race. The club has been a consistently strong performer at the British University and Colleges Sport Regatta, placing second overall in 2012.
The club employs assistant coaches Alex Leigh, who coaches the Women's team and Ciro Prisco who coaches the Men's Squad.
The club also relies on a strong network of experienced volunteer coaches.

History

Founding 
In 1904, Armstrong College was founded in Newcastle upon Tyne to teach physical sciences. At this time it was part of Durham University and the boat club – established in March 1911 – held the same status as other Durham colleges and competed in intercollegiate events. One of the first races was against the varsity third crew, who they beat and whose place they subsequently took at Durham Regatta. In 1924, a women's club was established and in 1929, the growing success of the club prompted to construction of a new boathouse on the River Tyne at Stella Haugh, the site of the Battle of Newburn.

The Boat Race of the North 
The Boat Race of the North is an annual challenge between the Universities of Durham and Newcastle in a similar vein to the more famous Oxbridge Boat Race. It is now in its 15th year (2015). Although the event has been traditionally dominated by Durham, the Newcastle team were the overall winners for the first time in 2009, and retained the trophy since. The event is held annually on the River Tyne in central Newcastle upon Tyne in May and is well supported by local spectators.  The event comprises 4 races:  Men's Championship 8, Women's Championship 8, Men's Novice 8 and Women's Novice 8.  The overall event winners are the University winning at least 3 races (a draw, with 2 races won each, leads to retention of the trophy by the previous year's winner).  The 2010 races took place on 9 May.  Both Universities won 2 races:  the event was therefore drawn and Newcastle retained the trophy. From 2011 to 2014 the event resulted in a forfeit to Newcastle University as Durham University declined to race. The Boat Race was back again in 2015 with Newcastle winning the two Championship events, and Durham the two Novices, with Newcastle retaining the trophy. In 2016, two new events were added: men's and women's reserves, Newcastle winning the two championship and reserve events, and Durham the two Novices. Newcastle won the trophy.

National and international achievements 

Since 1996 Newcastle students have been competing and medalling at the U23, Senior and University World Championships and other International Competitions such European Universities Championships, Duisburg Regatta, Memorial Paolo d'Aloja Regatta and Essen Regatta, with victories as well in UK at National Championships, Marlow Regatta, pennants in the Head of the River Race and Women's Eights Head of the River Race, wins at Henley Women's Regatta and at Henley Royal Regatta.

The Club won the Victor Ludorum at the British University Sports Association (BUCS) Regatta in 2016 and 2018, having been runners-up in 2007, 2008, 2009, and 2012. The 2008 BUCS Regatta saw NUBC winning 4 out of 7 heavyweight events.  NUBC came third in V.L. in 2010.   In the 2011 BUCS regatta, the Newcastle men were winners in the Championship eight, coxed four and pair, and retained the Championship eight and pair titles in 2012.

Athletes from the club have recently and consistently won medals at World University Championships and U23 World Championships.

Honours

Henley Royal Regatta (HRR) and Henley Women's Regatta (HWR) Wins

National champions

See also 
 University rowing (UK)

References

External links 
 Newcastle University Boat Club

 Newcastle University

Boat Club
Rowing clubs in England
Sports clubs established in 1911
University and college rowing clubs in the United Kingdom
1911 establishments in England